Ralph M. Hattersley, Jr. (1921-2000) was an American photographic educator, commentator, journalist and photographer.

Early life and education
Ralph M. Hattersley, Jr. (1921-2000) was born on March 31, 1921 in Montana where he grew up in Conrad. After graduating from high school, Hattersley spent a year studying art at the University of Washington, then left to attend Montana State College in 1941. Two years later, Hattersley joined the U.S. Navy, attending its photography school in Pensacola. He served on the Atlantic Fleet Camera Party, spending most of his time in Trinidad. He was discharged from the Navy in 1946.

Upon returning to the U.S., Hattersley enrolled in the Rochester Athenaeum and Mechanics Institute's photography program.

Rochester Institute of Technology
Hattersley graduated in 1948 from Rochester Institute of Technology (as Rochester Athenaeum and Mechanics Institute was renamed in 1944) and began teaching in the Department of Photographic Technology. In 1949, he was offered a full-time faculty position there, which he accepted and taught alongside Minor White, Charles Arnold, Beaumont Newhall and Robert Koch. Having both an art and photography background, Hattersley taught photo-illustration and art-based photography classes at the Institute for the next thirteen years.

Theorist and commentator
Hattersley wrote colourfully on his theories on the principles and procedures of photographic criticism in a lengthy article in Aperture magazine which it reprinted from Popular Photography, and his criticism appeared in numbers of publications, including in the American Society of Magazine Photographers magazine Infinity for which he was the managing editor.

Like his contemporary Minor White, Hattersley regarded photography as having a spiritual dimension; after pages of uncredited, uncaptioned photographs in a 1972 Aperture issue appears his statement;  He wrote about printing in a darkroom as an opportunity for meditation, a quiet time that can be therapeutic, and further, that "the upside-down image on the ground glass tends to engage the right side of the brain, the artist's side, more than the technical, left side of the brain."

White, in his Aperture editorial in 1964 praised his approach;  Hattersley's book, Discover Yourself Through Photography enlarged on his ideas. Across the Atlantic however, British commentators regarded such sentiments about the medium with caution.

Photographer
In 1961 Ralph Ginzburg approached designer Herb Lubalin to design a new up-market periodical called Eros, a magazine which took love and sex as its theme. It became the subject of a notorious freedom-of-speech trial with Ginzburg eventually being imprisoned in 1972 for 'distributing obscene material'; Hattersley's nude photographs are widely credited as being the trigger for the court case.

Later career
After teaching at the Rochester Institute of Technology, Hattersley moved to New York City. While there, he taught at various institutions including Columbia University, Pratt Institute, and the School of Visual Arts where he taught with Martin Friedman, Cora Kennedy, Roy Benson and Irene Stern. He served as a contributing editor to Popular Photography starting in 1957, in which he wrote the column 'The Hattersley Class For Beginners'.

Hattersley died on February 5, 2000, survived by his children, Cleve, Craig, and Lissa.

Influence
Hattersley was influential on a number of his students who went on to contribute significantly to the field. Among them were;

 Pete Turner; 
Jerry Uelsmann, who described him as one of “my three photographic godfathers: Ralph Hattersley, Minor White, and Henry Holmes Smith”; Bruce Gilden;
 Bruce Davidson, who studied at RIT 1951-4, remembered “an inspiring teacher, Ralph Hattersley. He showed us Smith, Cartier-Bresson, Irving Penn, and others. This really sent me in that direction—not imitating, but finding the way I wanted to photograph”; 
 Nathan Lyons; 
 Hugh C. Browning; 
 Sardi Klein
 Arno Rafael Minkkinen (who studied under Hattersley at School of Visual Arts, 1971 - 1972),
 Australian Roger Hayne who was inspired by Hattersley's course to set up Photography Studies College in Melbourne

Another student, Carl Chiarenza, hoped that attending the Rochester Institute of Technology (RIT) would lead to ‘a decent job at Kodak’. In his third year there, the Bachelor of Fine Arts degree program in photography was offered, developed by White and Hattersley. Chiarenza recalls,

Publications 

Ralph Hattersley ‘A Handy Kit for Do-It-Yourself Critics’. In 
Ralph Hattersley was managing editor of, and wrote in,

References

20th-century American educators
American art educators
American art critics
1921 births
2000 deaths
20th-century American photographers
American male journalists
American editors
United States Navy personnel of World War II
American expatriates in Trinidad and Tobago
University of Washington alumni
Montana State University alumni